Thergothon was a Finnish doom metal band which lasted from 1990 until 1993 and pioneered the funeral doom subgenre. They only released one demo, Fhtagn nagh Yog-Sothoth (1991), and one album, Stream from the Heavens (1994). Their sound was extremely slow and dirge-like in long pieces, which combined heavy guitar riffs, extremely deep death grunts and sparse lead guitar melodies. The band disbanded a year before the release of the album and its members focused on other projects.

Niko Sirkiä and Jori Sjöroos went on to form This Empty Flow, which marked a distinct stylistic departure from Thergothon. The project began as somewhat of a shoegaze band, taking cues from groups like Slowdive, but ended up as more in the area of trip hop.

Lately Sjöroos has gained reputation for composing songs for popular Finnish pop rock act PMMP.

Sirkiä, later known as Niko Skorpio, works as a visual artist and records experimental electronic music. He also used to run a record label called Some Place Else.

History
The band was founded in 1990 by vocalist Niko Skorpio, drummer Jori Sjöroos and guitarist Mikko Ruotsalainen as a death metal band, but soon became a doom metal band. In early 1991, Sami Kaveri was added as a second guitarist. A first demo recorded afterwards titled Dancing in the Realm of Shades was never officially released and the band made a new attempt in November 1991. This demo, titled Fhtagn nagh Yog-Sothoth, was released the same year in a limited edition of 600 copies and was licensed to the USA and Poland. In the spring of 1992, the band gave two concerts in or near Turku, where they played an extremely slow version of Venom's "In League with Satan". The band itself did not find concerts as an appropriate presentation of the studio material.

Preparations for the debut album began in the summer of 1992. Sami Kaveri left the band at that time and the band focused entirely on the role of a studio band, neither playing live nor rehearsing for it. Through this concentration of roles and people, the roles gradually dissolved and the members of the band exchanged their instruments and experimented with new ones. After the band had signed with the Italian label Obscure Plasma Records and began recording Stream from the Heavens in autumn 1992; two of the six songs on it were new recordings of songs from Fhtagn-nagh Yog-Sothoth. After completing the recordings and selecting the cover for the debut, the group decided to disband in spring 1993. The release of the album was delayed until 1994 and it was highly neglected by the music press. With time however, it sold several thousand copies worldwide.

In 2009, Russian record label Solitude Productions released a tribute album titled Rising of Yog-Sothoth: A Tribute to Thergothon, which contains contributions from bands such as Worship, Evoken and Asunder, Mournful Congregation, Colosseum and Officium Triste.

Musical style
Thergothon's music was very slow with extremely deep guttural vocals, using heavy guitar riffs, very deeply tuned guitars and with few lead guitar melodies. In addition to death metal, the band also integrated influences from styles such as gothic rock, ambient and progressive rock.

Discography
Studio albums
 Stream from the Heavens (1994)

Demos
 Fhtagn nagh Yog-Sothoth (1991)

Members

Last line-up
Niko Sirkiä (aka Niko Skorpio) - vocals, keyboards
Jori Sjöroos - drums
Mikko Ruotsalainen - guitar

Former members
Sami Kaveri - guitar

References

External links
 Thergothon information on Niko Skorpio's website
 
 
 Thergothon at Encyclopaedia Metallum
Thergothon at myspace

Finnish heavy metal musical groups
Finnish doom metal musical groups
Musical groups established in 1989
Musical groups disestablished in 1992
Cthulhu Mythos music
Finnish musical trios
Funeral doom musical groups